Frieda Hodapp (13 August 1880 – 14 September 1949) was a German pianist and student of Max Reger.

Life
From 1887 to 1891 she studied as a free student at Hochschule für Musik Karlsruhe. From 1891 to 1898 she studied at Hoch Conservatory. After her first appearance in Darmstadt in 1899, she began her career in 1901 with a concert tour to St. Petersburg and Moscow. Then followed an extensive concert activity in Germany and almost all European countries, alongside teaching. After giving up her concert activity in 1932, she started to give master classes in Heidelberg in 1934. She was married to the Dutch-German music educator James Kwast; after his death she married Otto Krebs shortly before his death in 1941.

Honors
In 1898 she received the Mendelssohn Prize in Berlin.

James Kwast and Frieda Hodapp were awarded the Mecklenburg-Strelitz Orden für Kunst und Wissenschaft in Gold in 1912.

References

Literature 
 Frieda Kwast-Hodapp , in: International Biographical Archive 08/1950 of 13 February 1950, in the Munzinger Archive (start of article freely available)
 Horst Ferdinand: Kwast-Hodapp, Frieda Elise , in: Bernd Ottnad (ed.): Badische Biographien . NF 3. Kohlhammer Verlag, Stuttgart 1990, p. 167 f. (online at LEO-BW)

1880 births
1949 deaths
People from Helmstedt
German classical pianists
German women pianists